Seh Piran (also Romanized as Seh Pīrān; also known as Sepehrān, Sepīrān, Spehran, and Spehrān) is a village in Zhavarud-e Gharbi Rural District, Kalatrazan District, Sanandaj County, Kurdistan Province, Iran. At the 2006 census, its population was 376, in 80 families. The village is populated by Kurds.

References 

Towns and villages in Sanandaj County
Kurdish settlements in Kurdistan Province